Michel Benoit Cogger (born March 21, 1939) is a Quebec businessman, lawyer and former Canadian Senator.

Cogger was a senior political advisor to and fundraiser for Progressive Conservative Prime Minister Brian Mulroney and helped run the party's campaigns in Quebec in the 1984 and 1988 federal elections in which the Tories swept the province.

Early life
Cogger attended law school at Laval University in the 1960s, where he became friends with Mulroney. The two were among a group of students who organized the Congrès des Affaires Canadiennes.

Career
Cogger was campaign manager during Mulroney's bid to win the 1976 Progressive Conservative leadership convention as well as the successful campaign which forced Joe Clark to call a 1983 leadership convention.

In 1986, Muroney named Cogger to the Senate. In 1991 the Royal Canadian Mounted Police laid influence peddling charges alleging that Cogger had taken payments from businessman Guy Montpetit in exchange for the use of Cogger's influence to win government grants and contacts. Cogger was acquitted in 1993 but in 1997 the Supreme Court of Canada ordered a new trial which led to Cogger's conviction in 1998. He was fined $3,000, put on 12 months' probation and ordered to do 120 hours of community service. Cogger successfully appealed the sentence which was substituted by an absolute discharge in 2001.

In September 2000, Cogger resigned from the Senate. He had been largely absent from the upper house during his legal battles and was fined a total of $23,250 for missing sessions.

Further reading
 Mulroney: The Politics of Ambition, by John Sawatsky, 1991.
 On The Take, by Stevie Cameron, 1994.

References

1939 births
Living people
Canadian senators from Quebec
Lawyers in Quebec
Politicians from Quebec City
Progressive Conservative Party of Canada senators
Université Laval alumni